Surin may refer to:

Places
 Surin, Deux-Sèvres, commune in France
 Surin, Vienne, commune in France
 Surin, Iran (disambiguation), places in Iran
 Surin Province, Thailand
 Surin, Thailand, capital of the Province and district
 Surin Airport, Thailand
 Mueang Surin District, the capital district of Surin Province
 Surin Beach, one of the main beaches of Phuket, Thailand
 Surin Islands, an archipelago in the Andaman Sea belonging to Thailand

People
 Jean-Joseph Surin (1600–1665), French Jesuit mystic, preacher, devotional writer and exorcist
 Surin Pitsuwan (1949–2017), Thai politician
 Bruny Surin (born 1967), Canadian athlete
 Igor Surin (born 1974), former Russian professional footballer
 Masira Surin (born 1981), Indian field hockey player
 Aleksandr Surin (filmmaker), Russian filmmaker, directed the 1999 film Flowers from the Victors based on Three Comrades
 Surin (Nestorian patriarch), Iranian aristocrat
 Surin Fernando (born 1983), Australian business executive

Other uses

Surin (grape), another name for the French wine grape Sauvignon blanc